The Pleasant Reed House was a sidehall shotgun house in Biloxi, Mississippi on the National Register of Historic Places.  It was built by Pleasant Reed (1854–1932), a former slave on a Mississippi farm who moved with his family to coastal Biloxi after the American Civil War.  Reed, as a freedman, worked as a laborer and carpenter and earned the money to build his own house for his rapidly growing family.

The house was saved by the Biloxi chapter of the Delta Sigma Theta sorority and added to the National Register in 1979.  In 2003, the House was moved to the new Frank Gehry-designed campus of the Ohr-O'Keefe Museum Of Art, where it was restored and opened to the public for tours.

On August 29, 2005, the House was destroyed by Hurricane Katrina. However, the original archival materials and photographs were saved by museum curators, and the museum's Board of Trustees voted to rebuild the Pleasant Reed House.

The Pleasant Reed Interpretive Center, a replica of the original house, opened to the public on September 29, 2008.   The center features exhibits on local African American history.

References

External links
 Ohr-O'Keefe Museum page on the Pleasant Reed House
 City of Biloxi page on the Pleasant Reed House

Houses in Harrison County, Mississippi
Museums in Harrison County, Mississippi
African-American museums in Mississippi
Houses on the National Register of Historic Places in Mississippi
National Register of Historic Places in Harrison County, Mississippi
Former National Register of Historic Places in Mississippi